Jeffery Danny Dench (29 April 1928 – 25 March 2014) was an English actor, best known for his work with the Royal Shakespeare Company. He was the older brother of actress Judi Dench.

Personal life
Jeffery Dench was born in Tyldesley, Lancashire to Eleanora Olive (née Jones), a native of Dublin, and Reginald Arthur Dench, a physician who met his future wife while studying medicine at Trinity College, Dublin. He lived in Tyldesley with his brother Peter; later the family moved to York where his sister, Judith, was born.

Dench attended St Peter's, York, where he began acting with the role of Cleopatra in George Bernard Shaw's Caesar and Cleopatra.

He carried out his national service at an army theatre in Catterick before attending the Central School of Speech and Drama. It was here that he met Betty, his first wife, who was working as a speech therapist. He moved to Clifford Chambers and joined the Royal Shakespeare Company in 1963, where he worked for many years.

With his wife Betty, Dench had three daughters, including Emma, a Roman historian.

Betty died from a heart attack on 11 January 2002. Dench then married Ann Curtis, a costume designer for the RSC and a longtime family friend. They lived in Stratford-upon-Avon. In 2012 he became the President of Stratford-upon-Avon Choral Society.

On 27 March 2014 it was announced that Jeffery Dench had died. Writing after his death, Sylvia Morris said:
When not playing grotesque old men, he brought humour, warmth and integrity to  his parts. As a member of the audience, seeing Jeffery Dench's name on the cast list was a guarantee of quality. Shakespeare did write brilliant leading roles for Burbage and others, but he also wrote for a known company of talented professionals. The RSC has been fortunate to have among its regulars a number of high-quality actors, safe hands that could carry the plays along with distinction. Jeffery Dench was one of those, and if there were to be a late twentieth-century version of the page in the First Folio 'The Names of the Principal Actors in all These Plays', his name would be on the list.

The RSC's artistic director, Gregory Doran, said he was, "the kind of actor that made the RSC what it is: he did not necessarily always play the leading roles, but proved by his presence that the company’s vitality lies in its strength in depth".

Selected acting credits

Film

Television

Stage

References

External links

Jeffery Dench at the British Film Institute
Jeffrey Dench (Aveleyman)
Merry Wives – The Musical at the RSC; accessed 19 March 2016.

1928 births
2014 deaths
20th-century English male actors
21st-century English male actors
Alumni of the Royal Central School of Speech and Drama
Jeffery
English male film actors
English male stage actors
English male television actors
English male voice actors
English male Shakespearean actors
English people of Irish descent
Male actors from Manchester
Male actors from York
Royal Shakespeare Company members
People educated at St Peter's School, York
People from Tyldesley